The Minister for Health is a senior minister in the Government of Ireland and leads the Department of Health. The Minister for Health is responsible for healthcare in the Republic of Ireland and related services.

The current Minister for Health is Stephen Donnelly, TD. He is assisted by:
Mary Butler, TD – Minister of State for Mental Health and Older People
Hildegarde Naughton, TD – Minister of State for Public Health, Well Being and National Drugs Strategy
Anne Rabbitte, TD – Minister of State with responsibility for Disability

History
Health care formed part of the portfolio of the Minister for Local Government and Public Health until 22 January 1947. On that date the new position of Minister for Health was created, with complete control over all policy regarding health care provision in Ireland. In the past, it was common for the minister to also hold the position of Minister for Social Welfare.

In recent years, and especially since the tenure of Michael Noonan in 1994–1997, being appointed as minister has become somewhat of a "poisoned chalice" in government circles and a portfolio to be avoided by aspiring politicians, during his tenure Brian Cowen referred to the Department of Health as Angola because there were landmines everywhere. A number of scandals, mostly due to medical negligence, have meant that the minister immediately becomes identified with the scandal. For instance the Hepatitis C scandal, the withholding of baby organs without parental consent or knowledge, the Michael Neary saga in Drogheda and other high-profile medical scandals have dogged the minister and department. Additionally the minister has to deal with logistic issues not seen in other departments such as strikes, shortages and queues which are all too familiar in clinics and hospitals around the country.

Overview
The Minister's duties include the creation and assessment of policy for the health services. The main policy sections of the department, together with their responsibilities, are:

Child Care
Child care legislation
National Children's Office

Continuing Care
Services for homeless adults
Services for people with disabilities
Services for the elderly and palliative care

Finance
Health insurance
Hospital planning
Public-Private Partnerships

Personnel Management and Development
Nursing policy
Personnel management and development

Primary Care
Community health (child health, dental services, AIDS, reproductive health)
General medical services

Secondary Care
Blood policy
Hospital services

Strategic Policy and Corporate Services
Corporate Services
Health promotion
Health Strategy Legislation

List of office-holders

References

External links
Department of Health
Health Information and Quality Authority

Government ministers of the Republic of Ireland
Lists of government ministers of Ireland
Ministries established in 1947
 
Minister
1947 establishments in Ireland